Back to Love is the fifth studio album by the Australian singer-songwriter Vanessa Amorosi. It was released by Angel Works Productions on 8 November 2019. Amorosi's first album in 10 years, it peaked at number 84 on the ARIA Charts.

Singles
"Heavy Lies the Head" was released as the album's lead single on 5 April 2019. The song peaked at number 33 on the ARIA Digital Track Chart.

"Hello Me" was released on 6 September 2019. The song peaked at number 37 on the ARIA Digital Track Chart.

In January 2020, "Lessons of Love" was announced as a competing song in Eurovision - Australia Decides, in an attempt to represent Australia in the Eurovision Song Contest 2020. A single edit version song was released on 7 February, the day before Eurovision - Australia Decides as the album's third single.

Track listing

Charts

Release history

References

2019 albums
Vanessa Amorosi albums